IBR may refer to:

Science and technology
 Image-based modeling and rendering
 Internet background radiation
 Integrally bladed rotor, a turbomachinery component
 Infectious bovine rhinotracheitis, a herpes-type viral disease of cattle
 Iodine bromide (IBr)
 Inverter-based resource (IBR), a generator connected to the electrical grid through a power converter

Organisations
 Institute of Boiler and Radiator Manufacturers
 Institute of Biomedical Research, at the University of Birmingham, UK

Other uses
 Income-based repayment, a method of student loan repayment in the US

 International Bibliography of Book Reviews of Scholarly Literature and Social Sciences
 Inverted Box Rib, a type of metal roof
 Ivey Business Review, an undergraduate business publication of Ivey Business School
 Ibaraki Airport (IATA airport code)
 Internet's Best Reactions by WTF1
Incorporation by reference, the act of including a second document within another document by only mentioning the second document

See also
 IBRS (disambiguation)